Grace S. Richmond (née Grace Louise Smith; Pawtucket, Rhode Island, 18661959) was an American writer.  She wrote the "Red Pepper Burns" series of popular novels.
 Her father was a Baptist clergyman, Charles Edward Smith.

Bibliography
 The Indifference of Juliet (1905)
 The Second Violin (1906)
 A Court of Inquiry (1909)
 Mrs. Red Pepper (1913)
 Red Pepper Burns (1910)
 Round the Corner in Gay Street (1908)
 Strawberry Acres (1911)
 Twenty-fourth of June (1914)
 Under the Country Sky
 With Juliet in England
 The Brown Study (1919)
 Red Pepper's Patients (1917)
 Brotherly House
 Red and Black (1919)
 Rufus (1923)
 On Christmas Day in the Evening
 On Christmas Day in the Morning (1908)
 The Second Violin (1906)
 Red of the Redfields (1924)
 Foursquare (1922)
 Cherry Square: A Neighbourly Novel (1926)
 High Fences (1930)

References

External links

 
 
 
 
 
http://www.online-literature.com/grace-richmond/

19th-century American novelists
1866 births
1959 deaths
People from Pawtucket, Rhode Island
20th-century American novelists
20th-century American women writers
American women novelists
19th-century American women writers